is a former Japanese castle located in Nagoya. 
It was originally outside the city of Nagoya in the countryside of the Owari Province. 

Lord Oda Nobuhide (1508-1549) built this castle in 1548. The following year, his third son Oda Nobuyuki (d. 1557) became the castle's lord, but was defeated at the Battle of Inogahara, where he fought against his older brother Oda Nobunaga (1534-1582). It is assumed that the castle was subsequently abandoned in 1559 and fell into ruins. A stone stelae marks the site of the castle.

The area today is overgrown with trees. Located on the premises is the Shiroyama Hachiman-gū.

The closest station by public transport is Motoyama Station on the Higashiyama Line and Meijo Line.

Castles in Nagoya
Former castles in Japan
Ruined castles in Japan
Oda clan